Onaka is one of a number of hardy hybrid grape cultivars produced by the prolific breeder Nels Hansen at South Dakota State University. It is a product of a cross of Beta (a hybrid of Vitis labrusca and Vitis riparia known for its cold hardiness) and Salem (a Vitis labrusca x Vitis vinifera hybrid). Although never widely cultivated and today largely forgotten, it has contributed to the cold-climate grape-breeding efforts of breeders such as Elmer Swenson and is a likely parent of his variety Kay Gray.

References 

Hybrid grape varieties